Madhavachari Srinivasan or M. Srinivasan (12 January 1937 — 25 February 2000) was an Indian Judge and Justice of the Supreme Court of India.

Career
Srinivasan was born in 1937 in British India. After completion of B.A., LL.B. he was enrolled as an Advocate in 1958 and started practice in Civil and Constitutional matters in the Madras High Court, Chennai. He was elevated as permanent Judge of Madras High Court on 2 June 1986. Justice Srinivasan was appointed Chief Justice of the Himachal Pradesh High Court on 12 August 1996. He was promoted to the Judge of Supreme Court of India in March 1997. Justice Srinivasan died in 2000.

References

1937 births
2000 deaths
20th-century Indian judges
20th-century Indian lawyers
Chief Justices of the Himachal Pradesh High Court
Justices of the Supreme Court of India